A cake pop is a form of cake styled as a lollipop. Cake crumbs are mixed with icing or chocolate, and formed into small spheres or cubes in the same way as cake balls, before being given a coating of icing, chocolate or other decorations and attached to lollipop sticks.
 Cake pops can be a way of using up leftover cake or cake crumbs.

The cake pop increased in popularity between 2009 and 2011.

Preparation 

Cake pops use many of the ingredients used in baking a traditional cake and can be made from cakes of any flavor.

Many recipes found online use a cake mix instead of a cake batter from scratch. While more convenient, it does not necessarily deliver the same result. The homemade or "made from scratch" cake recipes tend to yield a cake with a much denser crumb than what you'd normally get when using a store-bought mix, which ends up performing better especially after being mixed with homemade frosting. The denser cake is stiffer, making it easier to shape the balls and attach the sticks. Store bought mix yields a lighter cake that does not harden as much, and the sticks tend to slip out after attached.

Once the cake has been baked, or when leftovers from an existing cake have been collected, it is crumbled into pieces. These crumbs are mixed into a bowl of frosting and the resulting mixture is shaped into balls, cubes or other shapes. Each ball is attached to a lollipop stick dipped in melted chocolate, and put in the fridge to chill. Once the mixture solidifies, it is dipped in melted chocolate to form a hard shell, and decorated with sprinkles or decorative sugars. The cake balls can be frozen to speed the solidification process.

Making a cake pop is quite time-consuming. As for preparing the cake to be molded to its desirable form and applying decoration, some simple forms and shapes can be molded by hand such as spheres and circles while complex shapes may require additional molding tools.

See also
 Cake balls
Dango

References 

Cakes
Articles containing video clips
Lollipops
American desserts